German submarine U-1019 was a Type VIIC/41 U-boat of Nazi Germany's Kriegsmarine during World War II.

She was ordered on 13 June 1942, and was laid down on 28 April 1943, at Blohm & Voss, Hamburg, as yard number 219. She was launched on 22 March 1944, and commissioned under the command of Oberleutnant zur See Hans Rinck on 4 May 1944.

Design
German Type VIIC/41 submarines were preceded by the heavier Type VIIC submarines. U-1019 had a displacement of  when at the surface and  while submerged. She had two shafts and two  propellers.

U-1019 was fitted with five  torpedo tubes (four fitted at the bow and one at the stern), fourteen torpedoes or 26 TMA or TMB Naval mines, one  SK C/35 naval gun, (220 rounds), one  Flak M42 and two  C/30 anti-aircraft guns. The boat had a complement of between forty-four and fifty-two.

Service history
U-1019 had a Schnorchel underwater-breathing apparatus fitted out sometime before February 1945.

On 1 February 1945, U-1019 left Horten on her first, and only, war patrol.  Sixteen days into her patrol, 16 February 1945, U-1019 was attacked by a Polish manned Wellington of the 304/Q Squadron RAF west of the Hebrides, she suffered only moderate damage. She arrived at Trondheim on 9 April 1945, after 68 days on patrol with no further incidents.

U-1019 surrendered on 9 May 1945, at Trondheim and was transferred on 29 May 1945, to Loch Ryan. Of the 156 U-boats that eventually surrendered to the Allied forces at the end of the war, U-1019 was one of 116 selected to take part in Operation Deadlight. U-1019 was towed out and sank on 7 December 1945, by naval gunfire.

See also
 Battle of the Atlantic

References

Bibliography

External links

German Type VIIC/41 submarines
U-boats commissioned in 1944
World War II submarines of Germany
1944 ships
Ships built in Hamburg
Maritime incidents in December 1945
World War II shipwrecks in the Atlantic Ocean
Operation Deadlight